Smile is an unincorporated community located in Rowan County, Kentucky, United States. Its etymology refers to the facial expression of residents when their application for a post office had been approved.

References

Unincorporated communities in Rowan County, Kentucky
Unincorporated communities in Kentucky